The simple station without exchange Guatoque - Veraguas, forms part of the TransMilenio mass transit system of Bogota inaugurated in the year 2000.

Location 
The station is located in the sector of the center-west of the city, more specifically on the Avenue of the Comuneros with the carrera 27.

Serves the demand of the neighborhoods Veraguas, El Progreso, Ricaurte and its surroundings. The area is residential and industrial.

Origin of the name 
The name Guatoque means "creek" or "ravine" in the language Muysccubun, taking into account that where the station is located, the Comuneros channel that collects the waters of the rivers San Agustín and San Francisco, the second name Veraguas receives it of the neighborhood located on the south side.

History 
In 2012, when the phase III of the system was put into operation, the construction of the Sixth Street or Avenida los Comuneros trunk was started to establish a connection between the trunks of Carrera Tenth, Caracas Avenue and NQS. It was inaugurated in November 2015 and together with the one of Tygua - San José conform that trunk that is an extension of the Central NQS.

Main Services

References

External links 
 TransMilenio
 www.surumbo.com official interactive query system TransMilenio maps

TransMilenio